Yuen Tai-yung (born 1941) is a Chinese artist best known for his Hong Kong movie posters.  Dubbed "The Godfather of Hong Kong Movie Posters", he produced over 200 posters from the 1970s to 1990s that include notable films of Bruce Lee, the Hui Brothers, Karl Maka, Stephen Chow, Jackie Chan and Sammo Hung. His other works include advertisements, comic magazine covers, portraits, sketches, and satirical comics.

Yuen was born in 1941 in Zhejiang and raised in Shanghai. In 1957 during his teens, he moved to Hong Kong and started work in factories. Around 1965, he worked at the advertising company as an illustrator, a skill that he had to self-teach.

In 1975, Yuen was commissioned by the Hui brothers to create a movie poster for their second film, The Last Message (1975). After completing the job, he received another request to design a similar poster for The Private Eyes (1976). When The Private Eyes became a record-breaking box office success, Yuen found himself in high demand, and was able to establish himself as the go-to poster artist by local Hong Kong film studios.

In 1992, Yuen retired and moved to New Zealand. After his wife died in 2007, he returned to Hong Kong and resumed sketching and showcasing his works at art exhibit.

Awards
 2017 Hong Kong Film Award for Professional Achievement

References

External links
 
CineMaterial.com – Select listing of Yuen Tai-yung's art

1941 births
Living people
Film poster artists
Artists from Ningbo
Hong Kong artists
Hong Kong emigrants to New Zealand